is a subway station in Tokyo, Japan, operated by the Tokyo subway operator Tokyo Metro. It is located in the ward of Chiyoda (Namboku Line platform) and Minato (Ginza Line platform).

Lines
Tameike-sannō Station is served by the following two Tokyo Metro subway lines.
 Tokyo Metro Ginza Line (G-06)
 Tokyo Metro Namboku Line (N-06)

The station is also connected by underground passageways to Kokkai-gijidomae Station, which is served by the Tokyo Metro Marunouchi Line (with this transfer being an appreciable walking time) and Tokyo Metro Chiyoda Line, and it is possible to transfer between the two stations without crossing through the ticket gates.

Passengers
In fiscal 2019, the station had 150,922 passengers daily (Including Kokkai-gijidomae Station)

Station layout

The station has two island platforms serving four tracks.

Platforms

History
The station opened on September 30, 1997, as the southern terminus of the Namboku Line. The Ginza Line platforms opened at the same time.

It is named after the nearby Tameike Crossing (which is itself named for a reservoir [tameike] which once covered the area) and the nearby Sanno Shrine (commonly known as the Hie Shrine). Both "Tameike" and "Sanno" are names of bus stops in the area. The station was originally to be named "Tameike Station" after the closer Tameike stop, but the Sanno name was added in order to satisfy Chiyoda Ward (as Tameike is associated with the Akasaka district of Minato Ward).

The station facilities were inherited by Tokyo Metro after the privatization of the Teito Rapid Transit Authority (TRTA) in 2004.

Surrounding area
Kantei (official residence of the Prime Minister of Japan)
Cabinet Office
Sanno Park Tower
Prudential Tower in Tokyo
The Capitol Hotel Tokyu
Hie Shrine
Hibiya High School
Tokyo Broadcasting System (TBS)
Komatsu Limited
Embassy of the United States, Tokyo

See also
Nagatachō, Tokyo
Akasaka, Tokyo

References

External links

  

Tokyo Metro Ginza Line
Tokyo Metro Namboku Line
Railway stations in Tokyo
Stations of Tokyo Metro
Railway stations in Japan opened in 1997